

Portugal
 Angola – José Gonçalo da Gama, Governor of Angola (1779–82)
 Macau –
 Antonio Jose da Costa, Governor of Macau (1780–81)
 D. Francisco de Castro, Governor of Macau (1781–83)

Colonial governors
Colonial governors
1781